36th New York Film Critics Circle Awards
January 18, 1971(announced December 28, 1970)

Best Picture: 
 Five Easy Pieces 
The 36th New York Film Critics Circle Awards, honored the best filmmaking of 1970.

Winners
Best Actor:
George C. Scott - Patton
Runners-up: Melvyn Douglas - I Never Sang for My Father and Jack Nicholson - Five Easy Pieces
Best Actress:
Glenda Jackson - Women in Love
Runners-up: Karen Black - Five Easy Pieces and Liv Ullmann - The Passion of Anna (En passion)
Best Director:
Bob Rafelson - Five Easy Pieces
Runners-up: Federico Fellini - Fellini Satyricon and Robert Altman - MASH
Best Film:
Five Easy Pieces
Runners-up: The Passion of Anna (En passion) and MASH
Best Screenplay:
Eric Rohmer - My Night at Maud's (Ma nuit chez Maud)
Runner-up: Elio Petri and Ugo Pirro - Investigation of a Citizen Above Suspicion (Indagine su un cittadino al di sopra di ogni sospetto)
Best Supporting Actor:
Chief Dan George - Little Big Man
Runners-up: Paul Mazursky - Alex in Wonderland and Frank Langella - Diary of a Mad Housewife
Best Supporting Actress:
Karen Black - Five Easy Pieces
Runners-up: Françoise Fabian - My Night at Maud's (Ma nuit chez Maud) and Ellen Burstyn - Alex in Wonderland

References

External links
1970 Awards

1970
New York Film Critics Circle Awards, 1970
1970s in Manhattan
New York Film Critics Circle Awards
New York Film Critics Circle Awards
New York Film Critics Circle Awards
New York Film Critics Circle Awards